The 1981 Cork Intermediate Football Championship was the 46th staging of the Cork Intermediate Football Championship since its establishment by the Cork County Board in 1909.

The final was played on 16 August 1981 at Páirc Mac Gearailt in Fermoy, between Kildorrery and Glanmire, in what was their first ever meeting in the final. Kildorrery won the match by 0-10 to 0-08 to claim their first ever championship title.

Results

Final

References

Cork Intermediate Football Championship